The Plattsburgh Pioneers were a junior ice hockey team, based in Plattsburgh, New York, who played just 17 games in the Quebec Major Junior Hockey League during the 1984–85 QMJHL season.

History
The Pioneers were the QMJHL's first expansion into the United States. However, the league refused to hold an expansion draft to stock the team, giving the Pioneers a distinct disadvantage. Eventually, the team sported an all-American lineup of players, most of them not even good enough to play for college teams, let alone high-level junior hockey.

Plattsburgh's first game was played on September 15, 1984 at the Ronald B. Stafford Ice Arena against the Hull Olympiques, in front of 1,500 fans. Despite having only 17 players on their roster, and a second-period brawl that saw several players ejected (including Hull's Luc Robitaille, a future Hall of Famer), Plattsburgh managed a 6-6 tie after regulation. The Olympiques' Joe Foglietta would notch the winner in overtime, however, so the Pioneers settled for one point in the standings. It was the only one they would ever get.

The Pioneers' season quickly turned into a disaster. Coach Yves Beaudry decided he'd seen enough after the first game and quit; Denis Methot (the team's owner and general manager) took the reins and saw Plattsburgh take a 13-0 pounding in their very first road game, at Laval. Defense was the Pioneers' biggest problem, as they allowed double-digit goals in nine contests, including a 17-1 loss at Granby -- the team with the second-worst record in the QMJHL. The shell-shocked goaltenders, Joel Kiers and Frank Currie, faced 802 shots in 17 games, or nearly 50 per contest; they allowed 185 goals, or 10.88 per game.

The offense was poor, as well; they notched just 56 goals, last in the league, with Louis Finocchiaro scoring 13 of them. John Torchetti played eight games for Plattsburgh before turning pro with the Carolina Thunderbirds of the ACHL; he played several seasons in the minors before switching to coaching, and later piloted the NHL's Florida Panthers and Los Angeles Kings. Probably the best player the Pioneers held the rights to was Max Middendorf, who wisely played in the Ontario Hockey League instead. He was drafted by the Quebec Nordiques in 1985 and played parts of four seasons in the NHL, later becoming a linesman.

The last few home games were moved to the much smaller Crete Civic Center, to save on rent, but the tiny crowds were insufficient to make the $2,000 monthly payment. On October 27, Plattsburgh drew 800 fans, their second-largest crowd of the season -- but the game was cancelled after the ice compressor broke down, and the meager ticket money was refunded. Finally, two days later, the Pioneers folded, just six weeks into the season, with a 0-16-0-1 record; an attempt to move the franchise to Massena, New York was nixed by the QMJHL, who announced that games played against Plattsburgh would not be counted in the league standings or statistics.

As of 2019, the Pioneers remain the only New York team ever to play in the QMJHL; the Quebec-based league would not attempt American expansion again until 2003, when the Lewiston Maineiacs joined the loop.

References

1984 establishments in New York (state)
1984 disestablishments in New York (state)
Clinton County, New York
Defunct Quebec Major Junior Hockey League teams
Ice hockey teams in New York (state)
Ice hockey clubs established in 1984
Sports clubs disestablished in 1984